The Eastern Parkway–Brooklyn Museum station is a local station on the IRT Eastern Parkway Line of the New York City Subway. Located at the intersection of Washington Avenue and Eastern Parkway in Brooklyn adjacent to the Brooklyn Museum, it is served by the 2 train at all times, the 3 train at all times except late nights, and the 4 train during late nights.

History 

The name of the station was originally intended to be "Institute Park". However, the IRT received a petition from Brooklyn Institute of Arts and Sciences to change the name of the station to "Brooklyn Museum" to provide an adequate guide for the station's location. As a result, an order was issued on March 3, 1920, changing the name of the station to "Eastern Parkway–Brooklyn Museum". New signs and tiles had to be installed while the station finish work was already underway.

The Bergen Street, Grand Army Plaza, and Eastern Parkway–Brooklyn Museum stations opened on October 9, 1920. Service on the IRT Eastern Parkway Line had been extended from Atlantic Avenue to Utica Avenue in August 1920, but the three stations were not ready to open with the rest of the line. This extension was part of an expansion of the subway system known as the Dual Contracts which built not only IRT lines in Brooklyn but also those for the BMT.

During the 1964–1965 fiscal year, the platforms at Eastern Parkway, along with those at four other stations on the Eastern Parkway Line, were lengthened to 525 feet to accommodate a ten-car train of 51-foot IRT cars.

In 1981, the MTA announced the creation of its Culture Stations program to install public art in the subway. The Culture Stations program was started to deter graffiti, and was inspired by legislation in the New York City Council that mandated that 1% of the cost of constructing public buildings be used for art. The program was modeled on the Louvre – Rivoli station on the Paris Métro, which featured reproductions of the artwork on display in the Louvre. Four stations, namely Eastern Parkway–Brooklyn Museum, Astor Place, 66th Street–Lincoln Center, and Fifth Avenue/53rd Street, were selected for the program due to their proximity to cultural institutions. These would be among the first stations in the MTA's new station refurbishment program, which began in 1982. Initially, there was funding only for the Astor Place and Fifth Avenue/53rd Street stations. The Eastern Parkway and 66th Street stations had still not been renovated by 1986, even though the Astor Place and Fifth Avenue/53rd Street projects had been completed by then.

In 2002, it was announced that Eastern Parkway would be one of ten subway stations citywide to receive renovations.

As part of the 2015–2019 MTA Capital Program, elevators will be added to the platforms and street, which would make the station fully compliant with accessibility guidelines under the Americans with Disabilities Act of 1990. A contract for the elevators' construction was awarded in August 2018. Substantial completion was projected for October 2020, and the elevators opened two months later. Designed by Urbahn Architects and constructed by Gramercy Group, the project cost $25.8 million and included three elevators and a rebuilt staircase.

Station layout 

There are two local tracks with two side platforms. The express tracks pass underneath the station and are not visible from the platforms. A large mosaic displays Eastern Parkway and Brooklyn Museum. In the eastern mezzanine are architectural ornaments from the Brooklyn Museum collection, installed during the 2003 renovation of the station. The platforms and the eastern mezzanine formerly displayed abstract art paintings created in 1991 by artist Pat Steir, collectively called the Brueghel Series. There is an emergency exit from the express level at the south end of each platform. There is a closed western mezzanine blocked by a tiled wall and a door on the west ends of both platforms; the entrances to this mezzanine have been covered with metal hatches on street level.

Exits

The only two exits to this station are from the east mezzanine. One exit is on the south side of Eastern Parkway, in front of the Brooklyn Museum; the elevator is located by this entrance. The other is in the pedestrian mall on the north side of Eastern Parkway, across the street from the Brooklyn Museum.

Image gallery

References

External links 

 nycsubway.org
 Brooklyn IRT: Eastern Parkway/Brooklyn Museum (text used with permission)
 Brooklyn IRT: Map 2, Brooklyn IRT Dual Contracts (includes current and former track configurations, and provisions for future connections)
 Brueghel Series Artwork by Pat Steir (1994)
 Historic New York City Architectural Elements Artwork from the Brooklyn Museum of Art Collections
 MTA's Arts For Transit — Eastern Parkway–Brooklyn Museum (IRT Eastern Parkway Line)

IRT Eastern Parkway Line stations
New York City Subway stations in Brooklyn
Railway stations in the United States opened in 1920
1920 establishments in New York City
Brooklyn Museum
Prospect Heights, Brooklyn